Jan Zbigniew Łopata (born 16 August 1954 in Motycz) is a Polish politician. He was elected to Sejm on 25 September 2005, getting 8033 votes in 6 Lublin district as a candidate from the Polish People's Party list.

See also
Members of Polish Sejm 2005-2007

External links
Jan Łopata - parliamentary page - includes declarations of interest, voting record, and transcripts of speeches.

Polish People's Party politicians
1954 births
Living people
Members of the Polish Sejm 2005–2007
Members of the Polish Sejm 2007–2011
Members of the Polish Sejm 2011–2015
Members of the Polish Sejm 2015–2019
Members of the Polish Sejm 2019–2023
People from Lublin County